Waliv is a census town in Thane district in the Indian state of Maharashtra.

Demographics
 India census, Waliv had a population of 15,312. Males constitute 58% of the population and females 42%. Waliv has an average literacy rate of 70%, higher than the national average of 59.5%: male literacy is 77%, and female literacy is 60%. In Waliv, 16% of the population is under 6 years of age.

References

Cities and towns in Thane district